The Camden Valley Way is a  arterial road between Sydney and the historic town of Camden.

The Remembrance Drive is also another former part of the Hume Highway near Camden South. Camden Valley Way intersects Bringelly Road, The Northern Road and Narellan Road.

The road had become an important arterial road serving the fast-growing Sydney’s South West Growth Centre. Since 2015, the road north of The Northern Road is dual carriageway and has four lanes (two lanes in each direction) with a median strip.

Camden Bypass 
The Camden Valley Way was bypassed by the Camden Bypass between Narellan Road and Remembrance Driveway. The highlight of the Camden Bypass is the Macarthur Bridge, a 26-span,  concrete structure that carries the Camden Bypass across the Nepean River and its flood plain. The bridge was built between 1971 and 1973, originally to carry Hume Highway traffic, on a flood-free alignment around Camden. This bypass was in turn bypassed in December 1980 when the section of what was then called the South Western Freeway (F5) from Campbelltown to Yerrinbool was opened. It has grown in importance as a major arterial road linking the Hume Motorway, WestLink M7 and M5 Motorway at the Roden Cutler Interchange in Prestons with Camden.

See also

 Highways in Australia
 List of highways in New South Wales

References

Highways in Sydney